Kieran Adams (born 20 October 1977) is an English footballer. On 31 December 1994, he became Barnet's youngest ever player when he played against Mansfield Town aged 17 years and 71 days, a record he held for 15 years until it was broken by Kofi Lockhart-Adams when he came on as substitute against Cheltenham Town. During his time with the Bees, he was loaned out to Hayes and St Albans City. In total, he played 19 games for Barnet, scoring one goal, against Macclesfield Town, before spells with Billericay Town, Boreham Wood, Purfleet and Windsor & Eton. He finished his career in 2006, when he was released by Boreham Wood.

References

External links

1977 births
Living people
English footballers
Association football midfielders
Barnet F.C. players
Hayes F.C. players
St Albans City F.C. players
Billericay Town F.C. players
Boreham Wood F.C. players
Windsor & Eton F.C. players
English Football League players
Thurrock F.C. players